Rainaldo Cancellieri was a Roman Catholic prelate who served as Bishop of Sant'Angelo dei Lombardi (1502–1517).

Biography
On 16 December 1502, Rainaldo Cancellieri was appointed during the papacy of Pope Alexander VI as Bishop of Sant'Angelo dei Lombardi.
He served as Bishop of Sant'Angelo dei Lombardi e Bisaccia until his resignation on 23 December 1517.

References

External links and additional sources
 (for Chronology of Bishops) 
 (for Chronology of Bishops) 

16th-century Italian Roman Catholic bishops
Bishops appointed by Pope Alexander VI
Archbishops of Sant'Angelo dei Lombardi-Conza-Nusco-Bisaccia